Postcommodity, a Southwest Native American Artist collective, was founded in 2007 by Kade Twist and Steve Yazzie Their name refers to the "commodity era" of Native American art trading in the late 1800s and 1900s, with the "post" being in reference to their modern take on traditional Native art forms.

Their current members include Kade Twist and Cristobal Martinez. Former members are Raven Chacon (2009-2018), Steve Yazzie (2007-2010) and Nathan Young. (2007-2015)

Art style 

Postcommodity makes use of modern technology (sound, video, etc.) in a way that goes against what would be considered as Native American "Commodity Art". Much of this work has been considered as Asmr. Recently, they have been incorporating their work into architecture, such as adding speakers to pre-existing buildings, or creating their own structures.

Another recurring theme in their art is the use of Bird scarer balloons, which contain elements of Native American colors and iconography. Their context for using these balloons is to "function as an intervention repelling the manifestations of the Western worldview and imagination."

In addition to visual art and ASMR, Postcommodity has released music. Much of this music is compiled from other artists, and has been released in the form of LP records.

Artworks

2008 

 Repellent Eye Over Phoenix

2009 

 Worldview Manipulation Therapy 
 Do You Remember When?
 Dead River

2010 

 My Blood is in the Water 
 If History Moves At the Speed of its Weapons, Then the Shape of the Arrow is Changing 
 It's My Second Home, But I Have a Very Spiritual Connection With This Place

2011 

 Gallup Motel Butchering 
 The Night is Filled With the Harmonics of Suburban Dreams 
 Radiophonic Territory (Nocturne)
 A More Just, Verdant and Harmonious Resolution
 Mother, Teacher, Destroyer
 Repellent Eye (Winnipeg)

2012 

 With Salvage and Knife Tongue

2013 

 Game Remains (Ongoing)

2014 

 People of Good Will (2014-2016)

2015 

 Repellent Fence / Valla Repelente (US/Mexico Borderlands)
 Pollination

2016 

 A Very Long Line

2017 

 In Memorium
 Blind / Curtain
 The Ears Between Worlds are Always Speaking 
 Coyotaje

2018 

 From Smoke and Tangled Waters We Carried Fire Home

2019 

 The Point of Final Collapse 
 With Each Incentive
 It Exists in Many Forms

2020 

 Some Reach While Others Clap
 Let Us Pray for the Water Between Us

Music

2007 

 Postcommodity + Magor

2011 

 The Contour 2011 Sound + Vision LP: Piles of Cougar Pelts (recorded 2001–2011) 
 Your New Age Dream Contains More Blood Than You Imagine

2015 

 We Lost Half the Forest and the Rest Will Burn This Summer

Books

2010 

 Postcommodity + Magor, Postcommodity Publications (PCP)

Exhibitions

2007 

 4+4+4 Days in Motion Festival, Prague, Czech Republic
 Intersections, Institute Slavonice, Center For the Future, Slavonice, Czech Republic

2009 

 Martha and Mary Street Fair, Arizona State University Art Museum Happening
 Native Confluence: Sustaining Cultures, Arizona State University Art Museum
 Worldview Manipulation Therapy, Ice House, Phoenix, AZ

2010 

 Muorrajurdagat, The National Museum of Art, Architecture and Design, Oslo Norway
 It Wasn't the Dream of Golden Cities, Museum of Contemporary Native Arts, Santa Fe, NM

2011 

 Here, Pennsylvania Academy of Fine Art Museum, Philadelphia, PA
 Nuit Blanche, Toronto, Canada.
 Contour 2011, 5th Bienniel of Sound and Image, Mechelen, Belgium.
 Half Life: Patterns of Change, Santa Fe Art Institute, Santa Fe, NM
 Close Encounters, Plug In Institute of Contemporary Art, Winnipeg, Canada
 The Night is Filled With the Harmonics of Suburban Dreams, Lawrence Arts Center, Lawrence, KS

2012 

 18th Biennale of Sydney, Sydney, Australia
 Time Lapse / March 2012, Site Santa Fe, Santa Fe, New Mexico
Adelaide International 2012: Restless, Adelaide, Australia

2013 

 It's My Second Home, But I Have a Very Spiritual Connection With This Place, Headlands Center for the Arts, Sausalito, CA

2014 

 Boundary//Battle, Redline, Denver, CO
 Free State Festival, Lawerence Art Center, Lawerence, KS

2015 

 Ende Tymes Festival of Noise and Liberation, Knockdown Center, Brooklyn, NY
 Image Festival, A Non-Place in A Space, A Space Gallery, Toronto, ON
 You Are On Indian Land, Radiator Gallery, New York, NY
 Repellent Fence, US/Mexican Border, Douglas, AZ, U.S., Agua Prieta, Sonora, Mex.
 The Advice Seekers Want To Be Told Their Right, Denver Art Museum, Denver, CO
 Gallup Motel Butchering, CentralTrak Gallery, University of Texas, Dallas, TX
 Pollination, SouthwestNET: Postcommodity, Scottsdale Museum of Contemporary Art, Scottsdale, AZ

2016 

 Screens and Thresholds, Presentation House Gallery, North Vancouver, BC
 Visions Into Infinite Archives, SOMArts, San Francisco, CA
 A Very Long Line, Center for Contemporary Art, Santa Fe, NM
 People of Good Will, Musagetes Foundation, Guelph, Canada

2017 

 In Around Beyond, San Francisco Art Institute, San Francisco, CA
 I am you, you are too, Walker Art Center, Minneopolis, MN
Toronto International Film Festival, Toronto, ON
documenta14, Kassel, DE
 documenta14, Athens, GR
 2017 Whitney Biennial, Whitney Museum of American Art, New York, NY
 Resistance After Nature, Haverford Cantor Fitzgerald Gallery, Haverford, PA
 Land Art - Broken Ground New Beginnings, Florida State University Museum of Fine Arts, Tallahassee, FL
 A Very Long Line, Esker Foundation, Calgary, Canada
 Coyotaje, Art in General, New York, NY

2018 

 57th Carnegie International, 2018, Carnegie Museum of Art, Pittsburgh, PA
 Nature's Nation: American Art and Environment, Princeton Art Museum, Princeton, NJ
 Califas: Art of the US-Mexico Borderlands, Richmond Art Center, Richmond, CA
 Hyperobjects, Ballroom Marfa, Marfa, TX
 Coyotaje, Art Gallery of York University, Toronto, Canada

2019 

 how the light gets in, 2019, Johnson Museum of Art, Cornell University, Ithaca, NY
Desert X, 2019, Coachella Valley, CA
 Some Reach While Others Clap, LAXArt, Los Angeles, CA
 The Point of Final Collapse, San Francisco Art Institute, San Francisco, CA
 With Each Incentive, Art Institute of Chicago, Chicago, IL

Fellowships, Awards, and Grants

2007 

Telluride Institute Fellowship for a residency at the Center for the Future in the Czech Republic.

2008 

 Common Ground Grant, First Nations Composers Imitative, American Composers Forum

2009 

 Artist Project Grant, Arizona Commission on the Arts.

2010 

Joan Mitchell Foundation Painters and Sculptors Grant.
 Harpo Foundation Grant.
National Museum of the American Indian, Expressive Arts Grant.
 Elly Kay Fund Award for excellence in contemporary art.

2012 
 Creative Capital Artist Grant.

2013 

 Art Matters Grant.

2014 

Native Arts and Cultures Foundation Grant.

2017 

 Art of Change Fellowship, Ford Foundation.
 USArtist International Grant, Mid Atlantic Art Foundation.

2018 

 Fine Prize, The Fine Foundation.

2019 

 The Harker Fund of The San Francisco Foundation.

References

External links 

 Official website
 Bockley Gallery

American artist groups and collectives
Native American artists
21st-century Native Americans